Ney Pahn may refer to:
 Ney Pahn-e Abdollah
 Ney Pahn-e Seyfollah
 Neypahan